"Hurricane" is a song by American rapper Kanye West and Canadian singer the Weeknd featuring American rapper Lil Baby, from West's eleventh studio album, Donda (2021). The song features guest vocals from the Sunday Service Choir and KayCyy. It came from a jam session at Archwood Music Studio and was passed on by Chance the Rapper to West, who shared a preview in September 2018. The song was originally slated for inclusion on West's since scrapped album, Yandhi, and went through multiple reiterations prior to release, with the final version being debuted in July 2021. On August 8, 2021, it was accidentally made available via certain streaming services before being pulled less than 24 hours later, but was officially released with the rest of the album on August 29, 2021. It was also eventually sent to US rhythmic contemporary radio stations as the album's lead single on September 14, by GOOD Music and Def Jam. An R&B and pop jam with an atmospheric beat, it contains organs and bass.

In the lyrics of the song, West touches on personal issues. "Hurricane" received generally positive reviews from music critics, who mostly highlighted the Weeknd's feature. Some praised the song's creativity, while a number of them complimented Lil Baby's verse. It was named to year-end lists for 2021 by multiple publications, including Complex and Slant Magazine. The song won Best Melodic Rap Performance at the 64th Annual Grammy Awards, leading to West tying Jay-Z's record for the most Grammys among rappers.

"Hurricane" charted at number six on the US Billboard Hot 100, alongside reaching number one on the Hot R&B/Hip-Hop, Gospel, and Christian Songs charts. The song scored top 10 positions in 10 other countries, including New Zealand and the United Kingdom. It has been certified platinum in both the United States and Canada by the Recording Industry Association of America (RIAA) and Music Canada (MC), respectively. An accompanying animated music video debuted on March 8, 2022. Digital masked avatars appear in the video, escaping the ADX Florence prison building and watching the baptizing of a faceless representation of Jesus. The song was performed live by the Sunday Service Choir on multiple occasions, including at a 2021 Halloween concert with Justin Bieber.

Background and recording

The foundation of "Hurricane" came from a three-hour jam session at Archwood Music Studio between American music producer DJ Khalil, bassist Daniel Seeff, and songwriters Josh Mease and Sam Barsh. In July 2018, Chance the Rapper announced that West was coming to Chicago to produce a seven-track studio album for him, similar to those recorded during the Wyoming Sessions. According to producer BoogzDaBeast, the beat for the song was originally intended for Chance the Rapper, who passed on it after hearing it. However, when West heard the beat, Boogz recalled that it "sparked something in him", leading to the creation of the song and his now-scrapped album Yandhi, which was set to release two weeks after the demo was recorded.

On September 11, 2018, West reinstated his Instagram account, via which he subsequently shared a snippet of a demo version for "Hurricane", including him singing the chorus; the demo was recorded one day prior to being previewed. A week later, West announced via Twitter that Yandhi was set for release on September 29, 2018. West reaffirmed that the song was set to be included on the album via a snippet posted to Twitter on September 27, 2018. Yandhi went unreleased on its scheduled date and was eventually scrapped. Over time, "Hurricane" went through several iterations, containing vocals from Ant Clemons, Big Sean, Ty Dolla Sign, Young Thug, and Rihanna with several leaks of the song surfacing online. Though Yandhi had been shelved, "Hurricane" later went into consideration for Donda and created heavy anticipation.

After postponing the release of Yandhi twice, West revealed on Twitter that his recording sessions with Chance the Rapper in Chicago had helped himself reconnect with his roots and faith in Jesus. In early 2019, West started hosting choir sessions with the gospel group The Samples, enlisting choir director Jason White and songwriter Nikki Grier for help with choir arrangement and writing gospel renditions of songs in his discography. Clemons recalled that the sessions eventually "morphed" into West's gospel group the Sunday Service Choir, who performed around the world with the rapper. West recorded with the group for their debut studio album Jesus Is Born (2019), which is credited solely to them. The Sunday Service Choir were one of the guest appearances on Donda to be revealed at the public listening parties, while they contributed additional vocals to six of the album's tracks outside of "Hurricane".

On July 21, 2020, West tweeted "Lil Baby my favorite rapper but won't do a song wit me [sic]". Responding to the tweet, Lil Baby declared that nobody had told him West wanted to collaborate and the two arranged a meeting. The rapper was subsequently flown out to Cody, Wyoming, to record for Donda. During the session, Lil Baby recorded his verse for "Hurricane" after Kenyan-American singer songwriter KayCyy had suggested that he should contribute to it; having told him that it was one of the most anticipated songs. In an attempt to appear on the track, KayCyy recorded a bridge which West "actually ended up fucking with", according to the singer. The reworked song was first previewed officially on July 22, 2021, during the first listening party for Donda at Mercedes Benz Stadium in Atlanta. The version played at the event featured a hook that was "heavily autotuned" and performed by West himself.

In an cover story interview for GQ on August 2, 2021, Canadian singer-songwriter the Weeknd stated, "I'd love to work with Kanye again. Especially on production." The two had worked together twice in the past; firstly when a West demo evolved into the Weeknd's "Tell Your Friends" (2015); and the singer featured on West's 2016 track "FML" for their second collaboration. Shortly after the interview, West posted a photo of his call log to Instagram that included "Abel Weeknd", leading to speculation of the Weeknd being included on Donda. "Hurricane" was teased again on August 5, 2021, with the Weeknd performing the hook during the second listening party for the album at Mercedes Benz Stadium. Two days later, American music producer and frequent West collaborator Mike Dean went to Discord and Twitter to ask fans which version of "Hurricane" they preferred between the original version, new version, or a blend of the two. Dean stated in the Discord chat that he was showing West comments from fans; he also told Zane Lowe in an Apple Music interview that West "took all the information he got from everyone, including online reviews, personal friends reviews and he'd just kind of digest it all and adjust the album the way he wants".

Composition and lyrics

Musically, "Hurricane" is an R&B and pop jam. It utilizes West's typical production style, relying on an atmospheric beat, while including layered organs, heavy bass, and trap drums. It features processed vocals by the Sunday Service Choir that are triggered and cut off in the style of a sampler, moving between digital and choral styles, which was done by Italian mixing engineer Irko at the request of West over a phone call. According to Rolling Stones Paul Thompson, the choir vocals are processed "in ways that are slightly alien". Alongside the group, additional vocals are provided by KayCyy. West and Lil Baby perform a verse each on the song, while the Weeknd sings the chorus. He delivers gospel-infused vocals, as well as contributing a falsetto. The song's vocal production was handled by White and Grier, while Louis Bell and Patrick Hundley did the editing.

Lyrically, West discusses ongoing personal issues on the song, such as his breakup with Kardashian, his house, past, and fears. The hook sees the Weeknd exude confidence, singing: "Finally free, found the God in me / And I want you to see, I can walk on water." West presents himself as having engaged in a conversation with God, rapping that he "was up for sale" yet could not tell and then declaring, "God made it rain, the Devil made it hell." With certain lyrics, the rapper reflects on progressing from being a school dropout to a guest speaker at Yale University. Lil Baby provides a mournful performance with his verse, admitting at one point that he simply wants to "restart it".

Release and promotion

After Donda failed to release on August 6, 2021, "Hurricane" appeared on Apple Music as the second track on the Donda pre-order page. The track was made available via international streaming services such as Yandex and Line Music on August 8, though was not available on any in the United States. On August 29, "Hurricane" was included as the fifth track on West's tenth studio album Donda. The track was playlisted by Swedish mainstream station Sveriges Radio P3 on September 3, 2021. It was sent to American rhythmic contemporary radio stations as the album's lead single 11 days later, through GOOD Music and Def Jam.

On October 20, 2021, American rapper Big Sean performed his unreleased verse for "Hurricane" as part of a nine minute freestyle with Power 106's L.A. Leakers. On October 31, 2021, the Sunday Service Choir performed a gospel rendition of "Hurricane" with Canadian singer Justin Bieber for their Halloween concert at an anonymous rooftop location. The group were dressed entirely in white and surrounded by an audience dressed in black, while the singer rocked a white hood. During the performance, Bieber freestyle-sang over the track. On November 7, 2021, a rendition of the song was performed by the Sunday Service Choir for a session in tribute to the victims of a crowd crush at Travis Scott's Astroworld Festival set. The performance was live-streamed, as was the group's performance of it at a session promoting the deluxe edition of Donda a week later. On December 9, 2021, West performed the song at the Los Angeles Memorial Coliseum as part of his and Canadian musician Drake's Free Larry Hoover Benefit concert. Drake accompanied him on stage and the rapper's performance marked a return after the musician had performed alone, which shocked the audience.

On December 12, 2021, West performed the track as part of a surprise five-song set in the middle of fellow rapper Future's headlining performance at Rolling Loud California. While performing, he rocked a white hoodie, "Free Hoover" jeans, and Yeezy boots. On February 22, 2022, West performed "Hurricane" at the accompanying concert for his eleventh studio album Donda 2 in Miami's LoanDepot Park. During the performance of the song, West appeared to experience an issue with his in-ear monitors and seemingly lost his place, though it was speculated that he forgot the lyrics. The rapper's performance of "Hurricane" was followed by a performance of "Jail pt 2", which featured him reacting to the problem by throwing his microphone.

Critical reception
"Hurricane" was met with generally positive reviews from music critics, many of whom appreciated the Weeknd's feature. In The A.V. Club, Nina Hernandez chose the song as an album highlight due to the Weeknd's appearance. Echoing this opinion at PopMatters, Tony DeGanaro listed the singer's feature amongst the highlights, describing it as sublime. Chris Willman from Variety wrote that he lets out "an unknown gospel side", delivering "a chorus as ineffable as any on his albums". Aaron Loose of Christianity Today saw the song as proof that West is still able to orchestrate "a captivating moment", saying it "rolls into earshot like a wrathful omen" and later develops into "a gorgeous R&B prayer" delivered by the Weeknd. On a similar note, The New York Times critic Jon Caramanica commented that the song shows West maintains the capability "of orchestrating impressive pop music", creating a "disarmingly pretty" track with the Weeknd's "sweet vocals". Thomas Hobbs from The Guardian observed that West comes across as more authentic on the song and "less like someone delivering the doctrine of a corporate superchurch", while also noting "a massive hook" from the Weeknd, who "projects walk-on-water confidence". Writing for DIY, Ryan Bell pointed it out as Dondas closest resemblance to the hits that West used to create, attributing this to the Weeknd's "smooth hook" and "an atmospheric beat with an ominous gospel inflection".

At Exclaim, Riley Wallace asserted that the Weeknd and Lil Baby's features "help alley-oop Ye" one of his best works for years. Mark Richardson of The Wall Street Journal stated that because of the singer's "gospel-drenched vocals" and the rapper's guest verse, the song "merits repeat plays". Vultures Craig Jenkins pointed to West and the aforementioned two as "one of the better rapper-singer collaborations" of 2021, depicting the rapper as not seeming "labored with his flow". In the Los Angeles Times, Mikael Wood lauded the song as "a heaving R&B jam" and considered "a mournful Lil Baby" to be the main star. Thompson viewed the collision of digital and choral palettes when the Sunday Service Choir's vocals appear as one of the most interesting moments on the album, opining that they are seemingly "instruments at West's disposal" on the "pleading" song. For HipHopDX, David Aaron Brake proclaimed that its layered organs "could soundtrack the ascent to the heavens". Uproxx's Wongo Okon named the song as one of the album's highlights.

Not all reviews were favorable. In a negative review, Jonny Coleman of The Hollywood Reporter found the song's release coincidentally occurring on the same day as Hurricane Ida impacted the Gulf Coast to be distasteful, while he disregarded it as "another generic snooze-fest with all the usual Kanye production touchstones". Coleman felt West's production style had become overused, complaining that "the instrumentation veers into parody at points" when West gets bored or unsure of what to do, even if it is "pretty cool". Loud and Quiet reviewer Robert Davidson wrote off the song as possibly the album's most glaring point that West "opts for lyrical platitudes", assuring his collaboration with the Weeknd and Lil Baby passes by "without ever threatening to quicken the heartbeat", defining it as a "damp squib".

Accolades
The track was ranked by Complex as the 15th best song of 2021, with Waiss Aramesh praising West's vocal performance, introspective lyricism, and storytelling. It was picked by Slant Magazine as the 24th best song of the year; Charles Lyons-Burt was most impressed by the combination of the Weeknd's "crystal falsetto" with "the magisterial organ and booming trap drums". Exclaim listed the track as the 27th best song of 2021, while The Fader named it the year's 70th best. The song was awarded Best Melodic Rap Performance at the 2022 Grammy Awards, marking West's 24th win at the ceremony and tying him with Jay-Z's record for the most of any rappers.

Music video
In November 2020, a music video was initially shot in Manhattan by frequent West collaborator Hype Williams. Photographs from the shoot surfaced, showing Williams on set with West and Lil Baby. In the end, West went with an animated CGI music video that was directed by French film-maker Arnaud Bresson, who also directed the visual for fellow album track "Heaven and Hell". Production was handled by Laure Salgon, with motion capture being used. On March 8, 2022, a music video for "Hurricane" was premiered.

An army of digital masked avatars dressed in Yeezy Gap hoodies–resembling the music video released for "Heaven and Hell"–are present in the video, demonstrating a dystopian-looking society. The visual opens with the image of a half land and half water piece of coastline, accompanied by a grey dragon. This is followed by the army of digital avatars climbing fences of the ADX Florence prison building while lightning strikes, appearing merely as silhouettes initially until they can be seen wearing opaque masks. The avatars then escape prison to watch a faceless representation of Jesus get baptized, appearing on a beach where acid rain falls down. In the following scenes, people ascending towards the sky close to a beam of light, while swirling hurricane clouds can be seen. A flash of lightning pierces the sky, inviting the avatars to follow its light. The video also shows clips of West and his collaborators as CGI humanoids performing the song from a "strange heaven-like place". The video ends with a black and white photograph taken from Hurricane Katrina–which killed more than 1,800 people in 2005–of an American flag emerging from a pile of rubble. Wren Graves, writing for Consequence, called the video a "scatterbrained stab at a disaster epic", with "seemingly-unfinished CGI that flickers in and out of focus from frame to incomprehensible frame".

Shortly after the release of the music video, Russian painter Denis Forkas, who has contributed artwork for metal bands such as Behemoth, accused West of plagiarizing his 2017 piece Hortus Aureus in the music video for "Hurricane". Forkas claimed that he had not been contacted by any party involved in the production, and that the artwork was simply re-rendered for the video.

Commercial performance
Upon the release of Donda, "Hurricane" debuted at number six on the US Billboard Hot 100, standing as the album's highest charting track and West's 19th top-20 hit on the chart. The song's entry was powered by 29 million US streams, which led to it topping the Streaming Songs chart and giving West his third number-one. "Hurricane" lasted for 11 weeks on the Hot 100. It further debuted atop the US Hot R&B/Hip-Hop Songs chart, becoming West's eighth chart-topper and his first since "FourFiveSeconds" in 2015. The song stood among the rapper's seven simultaneous top-10 hits on the chart, which tied Drake's 2018 record. It also reached the summit of both the US Christian Songs and Gospel Songs charts, marking West's third number-one on these charts. On the Billboard year-end charts for 2021, the track ranked at numbers two and one on Christian Songs and Gospel Songs, respectively. The song was certified platinum by the Recording Industry Association of America (RIAA) for selling 1,000,000 certified units in the US on January 10, 2022, becoming the album's first single to achieve this certification.

In Canada, the track charted at number four on the Canadian Hot 100. On November 23, 2021, "Hurricane" was certified platinum by Music Canada (MC) for pushing 80,000 units in the region. The song debuted at number three on the New Zealand Singles Chart, charting similarly in Australia by reaching position 4 on the ARIA Singles Chart, becoming the highest charting track from Donda. The song was also a top five hit in Norway and Denmark, peaking at numbers three and five on the Topp 20 Singles and Danish Top 40 charts, respectively. It entered the UK Singles Chart at number seven, standing as the highest of West's three entries from the album. On April 29, 2022, "Hurricane" was certified silver by the British Phonographic Industry (BPI) for pushing 200,000 units in the United Kingdom. As well as the UK, it charted at number seven on both the Icelandic Singles Chart and Irish Singles Chart. The song reached numbers eight and nine on the Swedish Singles Chart and Swiss Singles Chart, respectively. "Hurricane" also entered the top 20 in Finland, Greece, Lithuania, Portugal, India, and Slovakia, while it peaked at number five on the Billboard Global 200.

Credits and personnel
Credits adapted from Tidal.

 Kanye West vocals, production, songwriter
 The Weeknd vocals, songwriter
 Lil Baby featured vocals, songwriter
 KayCyy Pluto additional vocals, songwriter
 Sunday Service Choir additional vocals
 Mike Dean production, songwriter, mix engineering
 BoogzDaBeast production, songwriter
 DJ Khalil production, songwriter
 Ronny J production, songwriter
 Cirkut co-production, songwriter
 Ojivolta co-production, songwriter
 Nascent additional production, songwriter
 88-Keys additional production, songwriter
 Jason White vocal production
 Nikki Grier vocal production
 Irko master engineering, mix engineering
 Sean Solymar mix assistance
 Tommy Rush mix assistance
 Al Be Back songwriter
 Cailin Russo songwriter
 Consequence songwriter
 Cyhi the Prynce songwriter
 Daniel Seeff songwriter
 Digital Nas songwriter
 Josh Mease songwriter
 Malik Yusef songwriter
 Orlando Wilder songwriter
 Sam Barsh songwriter
 Tobias Smith songwriter
 Alejandro Rodriguez-Dawsøn record engineering
 Devon Wilson record engineering
 Jesse Ray Ernster record engineering
 Josh Berg record engineering
 Kyle Fitzgibbons record engineering
 Mikalai Skrobat record engineering
 Reno Reagan record engineering
 Roark Bailey record engineering
 Shane Fitzgibbon record engineering
 Shin Kamiyama record engineering
 Zack Djurich record engineering
 Louis Bell vocal editing
 Patrick Hundley vocal editing
 Todd Bergman vocal editing

Charts

Weekly charts

Monthly charts

Year-end charts

Certifications

References

2021 songs
Def Jam Recordings singles
GOOD Music singles
Kanye West songs
Lil Baby songs
Song recordings produced by DJ Khalil
Song recordings produced by Kanye West
Song recordings produced by Mike Dean (record producer)
Songs written by Kanye West
Songs written by Lil Baby
Songs written by Ronny J
Songs written by the Weeknd
The Weeknd songs
Animated music videos
Song recordings produced by Ronny J